Dhakuakhana is a sub-division of Lakhimpur district in the north-eastern state Assam, India.

History 
It started functioning in 1989 when naturalist-bureaucrat Dr Anwaruddin Choudhury of Assam Civil Service, joined as the first (founder) Sub-divisional Officer (civil).

Geography
This place is bounded on the east by Brahmaputra and Dhemaji, to the west, by Subansiri river and North Lakhimpur sub-division . To the north Dhemaji and to the south, Majuli river island and Brahmaputra river..

Geographical position of Dhakuakhana is between 27.60 degree to 27.35 degree north latitude and 94.24 degree to 94.42 degree east longitude.

Demography
Dhakuakhana consists of diversified population of several ethnic communities including Chutia, Mishing, Ahom, Sut, Deori, Koch. Majority of the population are Hindus, however there are also population of diverse faith such as Christianity and Islam. The tribal community Mishings also follow their age old tradition of worshipping Doni-Polo, Sun and Moon God.

Education
Some notable education institutions of Dhakuakhana are:
 Dhakuakhana College
 Harhi College
 Dhakuakhana Commerce College
Pachim Dhakuakhana H.S. School
 College of Teacher Education (B.ED) Dhakuakhana
 Dhakuakhana Model H.S. School
 Dhakuakhana Girls H.S. School
 Central School
 Jatiya Vidyalaya
 ST. Thomas School
 Sankardev Shisu Niketon
 Srimanta Sankardev Vidyalaya

Economy
The economy is mostly agrarian with majority of the population involved in agriculture and allied activities. There is also a cottage industry of Silk present in the region.

Notable people
 Homen Borgohain, eminent Assamese author and journalist

References

Lakhimpur district